Jane Seymour (c. 150824 October 1537) was Queen of England as the third wife of King Henry VIII of England from their marriage on 30 May 1536 until her death the next year. She became queen following the execution of Henry's second wife, Anne Boleyn. She died of postnatal complications less than two weeks after the birth of her only child, the future King Edward VI. She was the only wife of Henry to receive a queen's funeral or to be buried beside him in St George's Chapel, Windsor Castle.

Early life
Jane, the daughter of Sir John Seymour and Margery Wentworth, was most likely born at Wulfhall, Wiltshire, although West Bower Manor in Somerset has also been suggested. Her birth date is not recorded; various accounts use anywhere from 1504 to 1509, but it is generally estimated around 1508. Through her maternal grandfather, she was a descendant of King Edward III's son Lionel of Antwerp, 1st Duke of Clarence.  Because of this, she and King Henry VIII were fifth cousins. She also shared a great-grandmother, Elizabeth Cheney, with his second and fifth wives, Anne Boleyn and Catherine Howard.

Jane was not as highly educated as Henry's first and second wives, Catherine of Aragon and Anne Boleyn. She could read and write a little, but was much better at needlework and household management, which were considered much more necessary for women. Her needlework was reportedly beautiful and elaborate; some of it survived as late as 1652, when it is recorded to have been given to the Seymour family. After her death, it was noted that Henry was an "enthusiastic embroiderer."

Jane became a maid-of-honour in 1532 to Queen Catherine, but may have served her as early as 1527, and went on to serve Queen Anne with her sister Elizabeth. The first report of Henry's interest in Jane was in February 1536, about three months before Anne's execution.

Jane was highly praised for her gentle, peaceful nature, being called as "gentle a lady as ever I knew" by John Russell and "the Pacific" by the Imperial Ambassador Eustace Chapuys, (who referred to her as Jane Semel in his letters,) for her peacemaking efforts at court. According to Chapuys, she was of middling stature and very pale; he also said that she was not of much beauty, but Russell said she was "the fairest of all the King's wives." Polydore Vergil commented that she was "a woman of the utmost charm in both character and appearance." She was regarded as meek, gentle, simple, and chaste, with her large family making her thought to be suitable to have many children.

Marriage and birth of heir 

Henry VIII was betrothed to Jane on 20 May 1536, the day after Anne Boleyn's execution. They were married at the Palace of Whitehall, Whitehall, London, in the Queen's closet by Bishop Gardiner on 30 May 1536. As a wedding gift he granted her 104 manors in four counties as well as a number of forests and hunting chases for her jointure, the income to support her during their marriage. She was publicly proclaimed queen on 4 June 1536. Her well-publicised sympathy for the late Queen Catherine and her daughter Mary showed her to be compassionate and made her a popular figure with the common people and most of the courtiers. She was never crowned because of plague in London, where the coronation was to take place. Henry may have been reluctant to have her crowned before she had fulfilled her duty as a queen consort by bearing him a male heir.

As queen, Jane was said to be strict and formal. The lavish entertainments, gaiety, and extravagance of the queen's household, which had reached its peak during Anne Boleyn's time, was replaced by strict decorum. She banned the French fashions Anne had introduced. Politically, Jane appears to have been conservative. Her only reported involvement in national affairs, in 1536, was when she asked for pardons for participants in the Pilgrimage of Grace. Henry is said to have rejected this, reminding her of the fate her predecessor met with when she "meddled in his affairs". Her motto as a queen was Bound to obey and serve.

Jane formed a close relationship with her stepdaughter Mary. Jane put forth much effort to restore Mary to court and to the royal succession, behind any children she might have with Henry. She brought up the issue of Mary's restoration both before and after she became queen. While she was unable to restore Mary to the line of succession, she was able to reconcile her with Henry. Chapuys wrote to Emperor Charles V of her compassion and efforts on behalf of Mary's return to favour. A letter from Mary to her shows Mary's gratitude. While it was she who first pushed for the restoration, Mary and Elizabeth were not reinstated to the succession until Henry's sixth wife, Catherine Parr, convinced him to do so.

One non-contemporary source conjectures that she may have been pregnant and had a miscarriage by Christmas 1536. In January 1537, Jane conceived again. During her pregnancy, she developed a craving for quail, which Henry ordered for her from Calais and Flanders. During the summer, she took no public engagements and led a relatively quiet life, attended by the royal physicians and the best midwives in the kingdom. She went into confinement in September 1537 and gave birth to the coveted male heir, the future King Edward VI, at two o'clock in the morning on 12 October 1537 at Hampton Court Palace. Edward was christened on 15 October 1537, without his mother in attendance, as was the custom. He was the only legitimate son of Henry VIII to survive infancy. Both of his daughters, Mary and Elizabeth, were present and carried Edward's train during the ceremony.

Death and funeral 

Jane's labour had been difficult, lasting two days and three nights, probably because the baby was not well positioned. After the christening, it became clear that she was seriously ill. She died on 24 October 1537 at Hampton Court Palace. Within a few weeks, there were conflicting accounts of the cause of her death. More recently, various speculations have been made. According to King Edward's biographer Jennifer Loach, her death may have been due to an infection from a retained placenta. According to Alison Weir, she may have succumbed to puerperal fever following a bacterial infection contracted during the birth. Weir has also speculated, after medical consultation, that the cause of her death was a pulmonary embolism.

Jane was buried on 12 November 1537 in St. George's Chapel at Windsor Castle after the funeral in which her stepdaughter Mary acted as chief mourner. A procession of 29 mourners followed Mary, one for every year of Jane's life. She was the only one of Henry's wives to receive a queen's funeral.

After her death, Henry wore black for the next three months. He married Anne of Cleves two years later, although marriage negotiations were tentatively begun soon after Jane's death. He put on weight during his widowerhood, becoming obese and swollen and developing diabetes and gout. Historians have speculated she was his favourite wife because she gave birth to a male heir. When he died in 1547, he was buried beside her, on his request, in the grave he had made for her.

Legacy 

Jane gave the King the son he so desperately desired, helped to restore Mary to the succession and her father's affections, and used her influence to bring about the advancement of her family. Two of her brothers, Thomas and Edward, used her memory to improve their own fortunes. Thomas was rumoured to have been pursuing the future Elizabeth I, but married the queen dowager Catherine Parr instead. In the reign of the young King Edward VI, Edward set himself up as Lord Protector and de facto ruler of the kingdom. Both eventually fell from power, and were executed.

In popular culture

In film and on stage 
 In 1933, Wendy Barrie played Seymour opposite Charles Laughton's Henry VIII in Alexander Korda's highly acclaimed film The Private Life of Henry VIII.
In 1969, Lesley Paterson portrayed Jane briefly in Anne of the Thousand Days.
 As part of the 1970 BBC series The Six Wives of Henry VIII, Henry was played by Keith Michell, and Seymour by Anne Stallybrass.
 In 1972, this interpretation was repeated in the film Henry VIII and His Six Wives, adapted from the BBC series, in which Keith Michell reprised his role as Henry; on this occasion Seymour was played by Jane Asher.
 Seymour was played by Charlotte Roach in David Starkey's documentary series The Six Wives of Henry VIII in 2001.
 Seymour is a supporting character in the 2003 BBC television drama The Other Boleyn Girl, played by Naomi Benson opposite Jared Harris as Henry VIII and Jodhi May as Anne Boleyn.
 In October 2003, in the two-part ITV drama Henry VIII, Ray Winstone starred as the King. Jane Seymour was played by Emilia Fox.
 In The Simpsons 2004 episode "Margical History Tour", Seymour is portrayed by the shrill Miss Springfield during Marge's retelling of Henry's reign. Henry (portrayed by Homer) quickly orders Seymour's beheading after hearing her annoying voice.
Corrine Galloway depicts Seymour in The Other Boleyn Girl (2008).
 Anita Briem portrayed Seymour as lady-in-waiting to Anne Boleyn in the second (2008) season of the television series The Tudors, produced for Showtime. In the third season of the same series, when Jane Seymour becomes queen and later dies, the part is played by Annabelle Wallis.
 Kate Phillips, in her first professional role, plays Jane Seymour in the BBC Two adaptation of Wolf Hall.
 Jane Seymour is portrayed in the stage adaptation of Hilary Mantel's Wolf Hall parts I and II, adapted by Mike Poulton. It was presented by the Royal Shakespeare Company in London's West End (2014) and on Broadway (2015).
 Lucy Telleck played Seymour opposite Charlie Clements as Henry VIII in Suzannah Lipscomb and Dan Jones Henry VIII and his Six Wives on Channel 5.
  In the musical Six, she was played by Holly Musgrave in the original Edinburgh cast, Natalie Paris in the studio and West End casts and Abby Mueller in the Chicago cast.

In books 
 Is the main character in Janet Wertman's Jane the Quene novel, the first installment in her Seymour Saga.
Is the main character in Carolly Erickson's highly fictionalized novel The Favoured Queen, which follows her from her appointment as lady-in-waiting to Catherine of Aragon right up until her death.
 Is the subject of the novel Plain Jane:  A Novel of Jane Seymour (Tudor Women Series) by Laurien Gardner (Sarah Hoyt).
 Appears as a lady serving both Catherine of Aragon and Anne Boleyn in Wolf Hall by Hilary Mantel, which ends with hints of her coming prominence. The second novel in Mantel's series, Bring Up the Bodies focuses on the machinations that led to the execution of Anne Boleyn, Henry VIII's growing determination to replace her with Jane Seymour and the Seymour family's strategems to gain from the King's attraction to Jane. The third volume, The Mirror and the Light, includes Jane Seymour's story.
 The book I, Jane, by Diane Haeger, tells of her growing up and, before catching the eye of King Henry, meeting a young man whose parents are well placed in court and look down on Jane and her family. Despite this, Jane and the son become close, and over the years she never forgets him.
Is the title character of Jane Seymour: Henry VIII's True Love by Elizabeth Norton.
Seymour is the title character in Alison Weir's book Jane Seymour: The Haunted Queen, the third in the Six Tudor Queens series.

In music 
 As Giovanna Seymour, she appears in Gaetano Donizetti's opera Anna Bolena.
 Rick Wakeman recorded the piece "Jane Seymour" for his 1973 album The Six Wives of Henry VIII.
 The English ballad "The Death of Queen Jane" (Child No. 170) is about the death of Jane Seymour following the birth of Prince Edward. The story as related in the ballad is historically inaccurate, but apparently reflects the popular view at the time of the events surrounding her death. The historical fact is that Prince Edward was born naturally, and that his mother succumbed to infection and died 12 days later. Most versions of the song end with the contrast between the joy of the birth of the Prince and the grief of the death of the Queen.
 A setting of the ballad to a tune by Irish musician Dáithí Sproule was included on the Bothy Band's 1979 album After Hours (Live in Paris), on the 1995 album Trian II by Trian (Sproule, Liz Carroll, and Billy McComiskey), and the Bothy Band's 2008 album Best of the Bothy Band.  The song also appears on Loreena McKennitt's 2010 album The Wind That Shakes the Barley, and on Dáithí Sproule's 2011 album Lost River: Vol. 1; and it was performed by Oscar Isaac in the Coen brothers' 2013 film Inside Llewyn Davis.

Footnotes

Sources

External links

 A quick overview of Jane's life, with a good portrait gallery as well
 A more in-depth historical look at Jane's life and times
 A geo-biography tour  of the Six Wives of Henry VIII on Google Earth
 The text of the ballad The Death of Queen Jane
 2015 Irish Examiner article 

|-

 
1508 births
1537 deaths
16th-century English women
Burials at St George's Chapel, Windsor Castle
Deaths in childbirth
English Roman Catholics
English royalty
House of Tudor
Irish royal consorts
Ladies of the Privy Chamber
Jane
Wives of Henry VIII
Household of Anne Boleyn
Household of Catherine of Aragon